Haddamshausen is a borough (Ortsbezirk) of Marburg in Hesse.

References

External links 
 https://www.marburg.de/haddamshausen

Districts of Marburg